Spinnova is a Finnish sustainable material company, part of a handful of companies “racing to produce recycled fabrics on a commercial scale.”

The company has developed a technology which can transform cellulosic fiber into fiber for the textile industry with a mechanical process. The company’s headquarters and pilot factory are located in Jyväskylä, Finland and it also has offices in Helsinki, Finland. In 2021, Spinnova and its partner Suzano Papel e Celulose announced plans to build the first commercial-scale fiber production facility in Jyväskylä. The facility is expected to open in 2024.

Technology 

Spinnova began developing its technology within the VTT Technical Research Centre of Finland, before becoming its own company in 2014. Spinnova’s technology transforms cellulosic fiber into textile fibers from bio-based materials mechanically. The company has used wood, textile waste and agricultural waste such as wheat or barley straw in fiber production. In 2021, the company announced that it will also start to develop a fiber made from leather waste

Recognitions 

 2019 World Changing Ideas Awards Winner in the Experimental category
 Fast Company’s 2020 Innovation by Design Awards’ Sustainability category finalist with Marimekko
 Sustainability Achievement of the Year 2020 award with Bergans
 Scandinavian Outdoor Awards 2021/22 overall winner with Bergans

See also 
 Lyocell

References

Cellulose
Companies listed on Nasdaq Helsinki